John Brewer may refer to:
John Brewer (American football, born 1906) (1906–1980), American football player
John Brewer (fullback) (1928–1983), American football player
John Brewer (bishop) (1929–2000), fourth Roman Catholic Bishop of Lancaster, England
John Brewer (historian), professor of history at Caltech and winner of Wolfson Prize in History
Johnny Brewer (1937–2011), American football tight end and linebacker
John Sherren Brewer (1810–1879), English clergyman, historian and scholar
John David Brewer (born 1951), English sociologist
J. Hart Brewer (1844–1900), American Representative for New Jersey
J. Mason Brewer (1896–1975), American folklorist
John Brewer (MP), British Member of Parliament for New Romney
John Brewer (monk) (1744–1822), English Benedictine monk
John Brewer (politician) (1800–1870), American farmer and politician in Michigan

See also
Jack Brewer (disambiguation)
John Brewer Brown (1836–1898), American member of the United States House of Representatives
Hotel Haegumgang, the current name of the John Brewer Floating Hotel